Eudore Pirmez (14 February 1830 – 2 March 1890) was a Belgian lawyer and liberal politician. He was director of the National Bank of Belgium, member of parliament, minister and burgomaster of Marchienne-au-Pont.

See also
 Liberal Party

Sources
 Eudore Pirmez, by Albert Nyssens 1893, Polleunis & Ceuterick, Bruxelles. 384 pp
 Liberal Archive

1830 births
1890 deaths

Belgian Ministers of State